Eurométropole de Metz is the métropole, an intercommunal structure, centred on the city of Metz. It is located in the Moselle department, in the Grand Est region, northeastern France. It was created as a communauté d'agglomération in January 2014, and became a métropole in January 2018. Its area is 306.0 km2. Its population was 221,484 in 2018, of which 116,581 in Metz proper.

Composition
The métropole consists of the following 45 communes:

Amanvillers
Ars-Laquenexy
Ars-sur-Moselle
Augny
Le Ban-Saint-Martin
Châtel-Saint-Germain
Chesny
Chieulles
Coin-lès-Cuvry
Coin-sur-Seille
Cuvry
Féy
Gravelotte
Jury
Jussy
Laquenexy
Lessy
Longeville-lès-Metz
Lorry-lès-Metz
Marieulles
Marly
La Maxe
Mécleuves
Metz
Mey
Montigny-lès-Metz
Moulins-lès-Metz
Noisseville
Nouilly
Peltre
Plappeville
Pouilly
Pournoy-la-Chétive
Roncourt
Rozérieulles
Sainte-Ruffine
Saint-Julien-lès-Metz
Saint-Privat-la-Montagne
Saulny
Scy-Chazelles
Vantoux
Vany
Vaux
Vernéville
Woippy

References

Metz
Metz
Metz